The Military ranks of Ivory Coast are the military insignia used by the Armed Forces of Ivory Coast.

Commissioned officer ranks
The rank insignia of commissioned officers.

Other ranks
The rank insignia of non-commissioned officers and enlisted personnel.

References

External links
 

Ivory Coast
Ranks